PMD may refer to:

In government and diplomacy:
 Pakistan Meteorological Department 
 Performance Management Division, of the Cabinet Office, Government of India 
 Possible Military Dimensions of a nuclear program (specifically that of Iran)

In health:
 Pelizaeus–Merzbacher disease, a central nervous system disorder 
 Pellucid marginal degeneration, a degenerative eye disease 

In places:
 Palmdale, California, mostly in hip-hop culture known as "the PMD"
 LA/Palmdale Regional Airport (IATA: PMD), a commercial airport in Palmdale, California

In science:
 p-Menthane-3,8-diol, the largest constituent in an insect repellent derived from the lemon eucalyptus tree
 Polarization mode dispersion, a form of modal dispersion of light

In technology:
 Pistolet maszynowy dywersyjny, a 1939 Polish machine pistol design
 PMD (software), code analyzer for Java, named from Programming Mistake Detector 
 PMD 85, 8-bit personal computer produced in Czechoslovakia
 Personal Mobility Device, a Personal transporter
 A 3D model used by MikuMikuDance, an animation software for Vocaloid's singers
 Photonic Mixer Device
 Physical Medium Dependent, an Ethernet Layer 1 (PHY) sub-layer
 The file name extension for Adobe PageMaker documents
 Pre-metal dielectric, a component of the back end of line stage in integrated circuit fabrication

Other
 Pokémon Mystery Dungeon, a video game series
 PMD (rapper), member of group EPMD and solo artist
 PMD Technologies, a German company using photonic mixer devices (PMD)
 Phi Mu Delta, a men's social fraternity
 Pakistan MNP Database (Guarantee) Limited, a system which maintains Pakistan's central number portability clearinghouse